This article is about the particular significance of the year 1789 to Wales and its people.

Incumbents
Lord Lieutenant of Anglesey - Henry Paget 
Lord Lieutenant of Brecknockshire and Monmouthshire – Henry Somerset, 5th Duke of Beaufort
Lord Lieutenant of Caernarvonshire - Thomas Bulkeley, 7th Viscount Bulkeley
Lord Lieutenant of Cardiganshire – Wilmot Vaughan, 1st Earl of Lisburne
Lord Lieutenant of Carmarthenshire – John Vaughan  
Lord Lieutenant of Denbighshire - Richard Myddelton  
Lord Lieutenant of Flintshire - Sir Roger Mostyn, 5th Baronet 
Lord Lieutenant of Glamorgan – John Stuart, Lord Mountstuart
Lord Lieutenant of Merionethshire - Sir Watkin Williams-Wynn, 4th Baronet (until 24 July); Watkin Williams (from 27 August)
Lord Lieutenant of Montgomeryshire – George Herbert, 2nd Earl of Powis
Lord Lieutenant of Pembrokeshire – Richard Philipps, 1st Baron Milford
Lord Lieutenant of Radnorshire – Edward Harley, 4th Earl of Oxford and Earl Mortimer

Bishop of Bangor – John Warren
Bishop of Llandaff – Richard Watson
Bishop of St Asaph – Samuel Hallifax (from 4 April)
Bishop of St Davids – Samuel Horsley

Events
July–August - Bread riots break out in North Wales.
23 October - Christmas Evans marries Catherine Jones at Bryncroes chapel in Llŷn, shortly after his own ordination.
8 November - Port Penrhyn opens.
unknown date - Blaenavon Ironworks begins production.

Arts and literature
12 May - Thomas Jones organises an eisteddfod at the New Inn (modern-day Owain Glyndwr Hotel) in Corwen, where for the first time the public are admitted.

New books
Jenkin Lewis - Memoirs of Prince William Henry, Duke of Gloucester
Richard Price - Love for our Country

Births
22 April - Richard Roberts, engineer (died 1864)
24 May - Betsi Cadwaladr, Crimea nurse (died 1860)

Deaths
28 June - John Walters, priest and poet, 29
24 July - Sir Watkin Williams-Wynn, 4th Baronet, politician, 39
7 August - William Edwards, minister and bridge-builder, 70
26 November - Elizabeth Baker, diarist, 70?

References

Wales
Wales